Villers-au-Flos is a commune in the Pas-de-Calais department in the Hauts-de-France region of France.

Geography

Population

Places of interest
 The church of St.Pierre, rebuilt, as was the rest of the village, after the First World War
 The German military cemetery

See also
Communes of the Pas-de-Calais department

References

External links

 Official website

Villersauflos